The Jingpo mountain stream snake or lined smithophis (Smithophis linearis) is a species of snake found in China.

References

Smithophis
Reptiles described in 2020
Reptiles of China